Mishrikh  is a city and a municipal board in Sitapur district in the Indian state of Uttar Pradesh.

Demographics
 India census, Misrikh Neemsar had a population of 15,163. Males constitute 53% of the population and females 47%. Misrikh Neemsar has an average literacy rate of 65%, higher than the national average of 59.5%: male literacy is 71%, and female literacy is 58%. In Misrikh Neemsar, 15% of the population is under 6 years of age.

References

Cities and towns in Sitapur district